Lü Zhuoyi (born 16 April 2001) is a Chinese footballer who plays as midfielder or full-back for Dalian Professional.

Club career 
Lü was selected by Beijing Wanda youth program in 2014, and received training session at Atletico Madrid. In 2020, he joined Dalian Pro youth team, and was promoted to the first team in the 2022 season. He made his first appearance on 10 July 2022 in a league game against Shandong Taishan in a 3-1 defeat where he came on as a substitute for Lin Liangming. He would make his first starting lineup in the following league game on 6 August 2022 against Shanghai Port in a 1-1 draw.

Career statistics

References

External links 

 

2001 births
Living people
Chinese footballers
Footballers from Guangzhou
Dalian Professional F.C. players
Chinese Super League players
Association football midfielders